Agustín Arana (born Agustín Arana Flores on August 27, 1968) is a Mexican actor and singer. He was a member of the Mexican singing group, Garibaldi. This was the second Garibaldi group that succeeded the first group of the same name. He grew up in a farm and had many horses. His favorite was Lagartijó, a loyal animal who only let Agustín mount it. He was a semi-professional boxer and fought throughout Mexico.

Filmography

Television

Awards and nominations

References

External links

1968 births
Living people
Mexican male telenovela actors
Mexican male television actors
Mexican male stage actors
21st-century Mexican male singers
Male actors from Veracruz
Singers from Veracruz
20th-century Mexican male actors
21st-century Mexican male actors
People from Orizaba
20th-century Mexican male singers